The 2020 PFF League (PFFL) was the 12th season of second tier of Pakistan Football Federation. The season was scheduled to start on 10 March 2020 and had to conclude on 5 April 2020. However, it was shortened due to coronavirus in Pakistan.

Promoted clubs

Teams 
A total of 18 teams contested the league:

Departmental phase

Group A

Group B

Group C

Final stage (Department)

Club phase

References

Pakistan Football Federation League seasons
Pakistan
Football leagues in Pakistan
Football competitions in Pakistan